The Eastover Subdivision is a railroad line owned by CSX Transportation in the U.S. State of South Carolina. There is also a main track spur just north of Eastover to Dominion Energy's Wateree power plant. At the Eastover Subs north end it continues eastward on the Lane Subdivision and at its south end it continues west as the Columbia Subdivision.

See also
 List of CSX Transportation lines

References

CSX Transportation lines
Rail infrastructure in South Carolina